William Humphries may refer to:

William Stanley Humphries or Stan Humphries (born 1965), American football player

See also
William Humphreys (disambiguation)